Perotis is a genus of Asian, African, and Australian plants in the grass family.

 Species
 Perotis acanthoneuron Cope - Somalia
 Perotis clarksonii Veldkamp - Queensland
 Perotis flavinodula Mez - Tanzania
 Perotis hildebrandtii Mez - West Africa (Sierra Leone to Nigeria), East Africa (Ethiopia to Tanzania), Madagascar, Seychelles
 Perotis hordeiformis Nees ex Hook. & Arn. - China, Southeast Asia, Indian Subcontinent, New Guinea
 Perotis humbertii A.Camus -  Madagascar
 Perotis indica (L.) Kuntze - China, Southeast Asia, Indian Subcontinent, New Guinea, Tropical Africa, Madagascar, Réunion
 Perotis leptopus Pilg. - from Tanzania to Namibia
 Perotis patens Gand. - Sub-Saharan Africa, Madagascar
 Perotis pilosa Cope - Kenya
 Perotis rara R.Br. - China, Southeast Asia, New Guinea, Australia
 Perotis scabra Willd. ex Trin. - Senegal, Gambia, Sierra Leone, Burkina Faso
 Perotis somalensis Chiov. - Somalia
 Perotis vaginata Hack. - from Burundi to Namibia

 formerly included
see Chaetium Mosdenia Pennisetum Pogonatherum 
 Perotis cubana - Chaetium cubanum
 Perotis latifolia Eckl. ex Steud. 1841 not Aiton 1789 - Pennisetum macrourum
 Perotis phleoides - Mosdenia leptostachys
 Perotis polystachya - Pogonatherum paniceum

References

Chloridoideae
Poaceae genera